Bassek Ba Kobhio (born 1957) is a Cameroonian filmmaker, writer and founder of the Ecrans Noirs film festival in Yaounde, Cameroon. He is also the Director of the Higher Institute of Cinema and Audiovisual Professionals of Central Africa (ISCAC) in Yaounde, the first-ever tertiary training institution for cinematography in the Central Africa sub-region.

Life
Bassek Ba Kobhio was born in 1957 in Ninje. He started as a writer, winning a short story award while still at high school in 1976.

Kobhio's first feature film, Sango Malo (1991) was an auto-adaptation of his earlier novel. The film portrayed a new village school teacher whose indifference to traditional customs causes conflict with the school's headmaster and disrupts village life. His second film, Le grand blanc de Lambaréné (1995), brought out the complexities of character of Albert Schweitzer. Despite clear differences of setting and subject matter, both films "offer vivid portraits of flawed idealists who wish to do good, but are authoritarian, puritanical, at odds with their surroundings and neglectful towards their womenfolk".

In 2003 he collaborated with Didier Ouénangaré on The Silence of the Forest, an adaptation of a novel by Étienne Goyémidé.

Works

Films
 Sango Malo / The Village Teacher, 1990
 Le grand blanc de Lambaréné / The Great White Man of Lambaréné, 1995
 Musique s'en va-t-en guerre [Music goes to war], 1997. Documentary.
 (with Didier Ouénangaré) Le silence de la forêt / The Forest, 2003

Books
 Sango Malo: le maître du canton [Sango Malo: the village teacher], Paris: L'Harmattan, 1981
 Les eaux qui débordent: nouvelles'', Paris: L'Harmattan, 1984

References

External links
 
 Bassek Ba Kobhio, African Film Festival, Inc.

1957 births
Living people
Cameroonian film directors
Cameroonian film producers